The Seinäjoki railway station is located in the centre of city of Seinäjoki, Finland, at Valtionkatu 1. The current station building was built in the 1970s, and it is located in the same building as the bus station. In the 2000s, the building was renovated as a modern travel centre.

Seinäjoki is a significant crossing point, with connections toward Haapamäki, Helsinki, Vaasa and Oulu. The track to Kaskinen only has cargo traffic nowadays.

In front of the station building is a statue representing a railway worker.

External links

 Seinäjoki travel centre

Railway station
Railway stations in South Ostrobothnia